A referendum on a number of proposals made by President Sténio Vincent was held in Haiti on 10 February 1935. The changes were aimed at liberating the country from foreign financial control and improving the country's economy. They were reportedly approved by 99.7% of voters.

Results

References

1935 in Haiti
1935 referendums
Initiatives and referendums in Haiti
February 1935 events